

Events

Arts and literature
American Tabloid (novel) by James Ellroy
Excellent Cadavers (non-fiction book) by Alexander Stille
Casino (film)  starring Robert De Niro, Joe Pesci and Sharon Stone
Tough Guy: The True Story of "Crazy" Eddie Maloney (autobiography) by Eddie Maloney 
The Usual Suspects (film)  starring Stephen Baldwin, Gabriel Byrne, Benicio del Toro, Kevin Pollak, Kevin Spacey, Chazz Palminteri and Pete Postlethwaite
Heat (film)

Births

Deaths 
Joseph Zingaro, Gambino crime family capo    
Louis Grecco, Patriacra crime family associate 
January 26 – William Cammisano "Willie the Rat", Kansas City mobster  
March 17 – Ronnie Kray, UK crime boss, Kray Firm
March 20 - Joseph Schiro-Scarpa, New York drug dealer affiliated with the Colombo LCN Family and son of mobster of Gregory "The Grim Reaper" Scarpa, Sr.
April 1 - Louis Raucci, Pittsburgh mobster involved in drug trafficking
June 23 - Frank Salemme, Jr., Patriarca crime family soldier and son of crime boss "Cadillac" Frank Salemme
August 13 - Dominic Musitano, Toronto mobster
September 1 – Joseph N. Gallo, Gambino crime family consigliere
September 21 – Albert Tocco, Chicago Outfit member
November 22 – Frank O'Hehir, Colombo crime family associate  
November 24 – Benjamin "Lefty Guns" Ruggiero, Bonanno crime family member

References

Organized crime
Years in organized crime